The Ronquières Inclined Plane is a Belgian canal inclined plane on the Brussels-Charleroi Canal in the province of Hainaut in Wallonia that opened in April 1968 after six years of construction. It is in the municipality of Braine-le-Comte and takes its name from the nearby village of Ronquières.

The purpose of the construction was to reduce the delays imposed by the 14 locks (already reduced from 16 in the 19th century), which had hitherto been needed for the canal to follow the local topography.

Description 
It consists of two large caissons mounted on rails. It can carry one boat of 1,350 tonnes or many smaller boats within the same limits.

Each caisson has a 5,200-tonne counterweight running in the trough below the rails, which permits the caisson to be moved independently of the other. Each caisson is pulled by 8 cables wound by capstans located at the top end of the inclined plane.

In popular culture
 The film Brussels by Night (1983) takes place (in part) at the inclined plane of Ronquières.

Photo gallery

Further reading

See also 
Strépy-Thieu boat lift
Article on the French-language Wikipedia from which this article was translated
Falkirk Wheel

References

External links 
Ronquières, the non official site
Official Site
  — with photos

Transport infrastructure completed in 1968
Canal inclined planes
Locks of Belgium
Buildings and structures in Hainaut (province)